Chris Ward is a sound editor. He and fellow sound editor Brent Burge were nominated for an Academy Award for Best Sound Editing  for the 2013 film The Hobbit: The Desolation of Smaug.

References

External links

Sound editors
Living people
1970 births